Sybaguasu is a genus of longhorn beetles of the subfamily Lamiinae, containing the following species:

 Sybaguasu anemum Martins & Galileo, 2004
 Sybaguasu cornutum Galileo & Martins, 2005
 Sybaguasu cupreum Galileo & Martins, 2004
 Sybaguasu longipennis (Bates, 1881)
 Sybaguasu murinum (Pascoe, 1866)
 Sybaguasu pubicorne (Bates, 1881)
 Sybaguasu subcarinatus (Bates, 1885)
 Sybaguasu thoracicum (Olivier, 1795)
 Sybaguasu titingum Martins & Galileo, 1991

References

Hemilophini